Belarus is a landlocked, generally flat country (the average elevation is  above sea level) without natural borders, that occupies an area of . Its neighbors are Russia to the east and northeast, Latvia to the north, Lithuania to the northwest, Poland to the west, and Ukraine to the south.

Topography and drainage

Belarus's level terrain is broken up by the Belarusian Ridge (Byelaruskaya Hrada), a swathe of elevated territory of individual highlands, that runs diagonally through the country from west-southwest to east-northeast. Its highest point is the  Mount Dzyarzhynskaya, named for Felix Dzerzhinsky, head of Cheka. Northern Belarus has a hilly landscape with many lakes and gently sloping ridges created by glacial debris. In the south, about one-third of the republic's territory around the Pripiac River is taken up by the low-lying swampy plain of Palyessye, shared with Ukraine, Poland, and Russia.

Belarus's 3,000 streams and 4,000 lakes are major features of the landscape and are used for floating timber, shipping, and power generation. Major rivers are the west-flowing Western Dvina and Nyoman rivers, and the south-flowing Dnieper with its tributaries, the Berezina, Sozh, and Prypyat rivers. The Prypyat River has served as a bridge between the Dnieper, flowing to Ukraine, and the Vistula in Poland since the period of Kievan Rus'.

Glacial scouring accounts for the flatness of Belarusian terrain and for its numerous lakes. Lake Narach, the country's largest lake, covers 79.6 square kilometers. Other big lakes are the Osveya (52.8 km2), the Chervonoye (43.8 km2), the Lukomlskoye (36.7 km2) and the Dryvyaty (36.1 km2). Lake Drūkšiai (44.8 km2) is situated on the border of Belarus and Lithuania. The deepest lake in Belarus is the Doŭhaje (53.7 m). The Chervonoye is the most shallow among the large lakes, with a maximum depth of 4 m. The majority of large lakes are situated in northern Belarus. In Braslaw and Ušačy districts, lakes cover more than 10% of their territory.

Nearly one-third of the country is covered with pushchas, large unpopulated tracts of forests. Share of area covered with forests ranges from 34% in the Brest and Hrodna regions to 45% in the Homiel region. Forests cover 36–37.5% of the Minsk, Mahilioŭ and Vitsebsk regions. Districts with the highest percentage of area covered by forests are Rasony and Lielčycy, in the extreme northern and southern parts of Belarus respectively. The level of woodiness had declined during history – from 60% in 1600 AD to 22% in 1922 but started to increase in the middle of the 20th century. The Białowieża Forest, shared with Poland in the far west, is the oldest and most magnificent of the forests; a reservation here shelters animals and birds that became extinct elsewhere in the distant past.

Climate
Because of the proximity of the Baltic Sea ( at the closest point), the country has a temperate continental climate. Winters last between 105 and 145 days, and summers last up to 150 days.

The highest average yearly precipitation is recorded in Navahrudak (769 mm per year). The highest yearly precipitation ever recorded was in Vasilievičy (1,115 mm per year), the lowest – in Brahin (298 mm). 70% of precipitation falls from April to October. Heavy rains are common in summer. Sometimes one-day precipitation during summer rainfall exceeds average monthly precipitation. The heaviest rain ever was recorded in July 1973 in Slaŭnaje in Talachyn Raion – 148 mm in one day. The highest humidity level is observed in December and January (90%), the lowest – in May and June (65–70%) with an average level of 80%. Days with humidity lower than 30% are rare – usually less than 20 every year, with only 3–5 such days in some regions. On the contrary, there are more than 100 days with high humidity (over 80%), in some regions – up to 152. Due to high humidity, areas around Minsk and Navahrudak have from 65 to 100 foggy days every year.

Flora and fauna
In Belarus, nearly 1,500 species of vascular plants (including 1,422 flowering plants), 450 mosses, 2,000 algae and 1,500 fungus species are known. In the north, conifers predominate in forests that also include birch and alder; farther south, other deciduous trees grow. Pines compose 50.2% of total forest area, spruces – 10%, black alder – 8.2%, oaks – 3.3%, gray alder – 2.3%, aspen – 2.1%. 15.4% of Belarus is covered by meadows with one third being natural and the rest being specially cultivated. The most common plants on natural meadows are Deschampsia and several different sedges (Carex). In the marshes, 267 species of Embryophyta are growing – herbs (167 species), trees and bushes (37 species), Bryidae (32 species) and Sphagnopsida (31 species). 50 of them are considered drug plants.

Animals in Belarus are those common to Central and Eastern Europe.

National Parks 
The National Parks are a huge part of the country's identity. The people of Belarus are particularly proud of their country's national parks. Belovezhskaya Pushcha National Park is a preserved part of the UNESCO World Heritage Site Białowieża Forest in Belarus since 1992. Later, the Council of Europe stated that the park was one of the most conservation conscious areas. Many animals can be found in these parks, i.e., red deer, wild boar and elk.

Environmental concerns
 Environment – Current Issues
 Air Quality – Air quality in Belarus has been an issue for many years in the past. Belarus is ranked third in the world for death associated with air pollution, a ratio of 100 out of every 100,000 deaths from 2010 to 2012. However, in recent years the quality of the air has been improving by almost 50% according to the Organisation for Economic Co-operation and Development. The increased use of natural gas and alternative energy to burning coal is the leading fight against the pollution. Policies implemented in Belarus can also be seen as a leading cause of the quality of air going up and becoming better. Fines and fees may be used to enforce rules and regulations and also to keep awareness of the issue known. The money brought in from the fees and fines are used by the Environmental Fund in Belarus.

 The south-eastern part of the country was contaminated with fallout from the 1986 accident at the Chernobyl Nuclear Power Plant in Ukraine, receiving about 70% of the radiation. Vast amounts of territory in Homyel and Mahilyow voblasts were rendered uninhabitable. Roughly  of soil were contaminated by caesium-137 to levels greater than 15 curies (550 gigabecquerels) per square kilometer, i.e., taken from human usage for an indefinite time. Overall economic costs for containment and decontamination is estimated at $235 billion in Belarus.
 Environment – international agreements
 Party to treaties: Air Pollution, Air Pollution-Nitrogen Oxides, Air Pollution-Sulphur 85, Biodiversity, Climate Change, Climate Change-Kyoto Protocol, Desertification, Endangered Species, Environmental Modification, Hazardous Wastes, Law of the Sea, Marine Dumping, Ozone Layer Protection, Ship Pollution, Wetlands

Area and boundaries
 Area
 Total: 207,600 km² (81,054 sq mi)
country comparison to the world: 86
 Land: 202,900 km² (81,054 sq mi)
 Water: 4,7000 km²
 Area comparative
 Australia comparative: Belarus slightly smaller than Victoria
 Canada comparative: Belarus half the size of Newfoundland and Labrador
 Europe comparative: Belarus holds 13th place, slightly smaller than the United Kingdom or Romania
 United States comparative: Belarus slightly smaller than Kansas.
 Land boundaries
 Total: 3,642 km
 Border countries: Latvia 161 km, Lithuania 640 km, Poland 418 km, Russia 1,312 km, Ukraine 1,111 km
 Coastline
 0 km (0 mi). Belarus is landlocked; the nearest body of water is the Baltic Sea, yet Lithuania and Latvia block access to the Baltic.
 Maritime claims
 None (landlocked)
 Elevation extremes
 Lowest point: Neman River 90 m (295 ft)
 Highest point: Dzyarzhynskaya Hara 346 m (1,135 ft)

Natural resources

The natural resources of Belarus include timber, peat deposits, small quantities of oil and natural gas, granite, dolomitic limestone, marl, chalk, sand, gravel, clay, potash, and halite (salt).

Potash, halite and phosphorite
Belarus has a large number of potash deposits – all formed  during the Famennian stage of the Late Devonian epoch – with commercial reserves of 10 billion metric tonnes. Three main potash deposits have been explored – Starobin, Petrikov and Oktyabrsky. Sylvinite (potash ore) from these three deposits contains up to 28%, 40% and 39% KCl respectively. Amounts of MgCl2 vary from 0.15–0.3% in Starobin to 1.5–4% in Petrikov and more than 5% in Oktyabrsky. The Starobin deposit has 2.6 billion tonnes of proven reserves (A, B, C1 categories) and 600 million tonnes of prognosed reserves (C2 category) of potash. Reserves at the Petrikov deposit are estimated at 2.12 billion tonnes (C1 and C2 categories) of potash. The Oktyabrsky deposit has 637 million tonnes of potash (C1 and C2) and 1.1 billion tonnes of carnallite. Only the Starobin deposit is used, but in 2014 construction of the first factory in the Petrikov deposit began. Several smaller, less-explored deposits are known, mainly in Homiel Voblasts and Minsk Voblasts.

Large halite (salt) deposits were formed during Frasnian and Famennian stages of the Late Devonian epoch. Saliferous formations cover 26,000 km2 in the southeastern part of the country. Three deposits have been explored – Starobin (in Minsk Voblasts), Mazyr and Davydaŭskaje (both in Homiel Voblasts). The Davydaŭskaje deposit is the biggest, with proven reserves over 20 billion tonnes, but only the Starobin and Mazyr deposits are used to produce salt. More than 350,000 tonnes of halite are mined in the Starobin deposit per year (2004). In the Mazyr deposit, the saliferous liquid is extracted via wells, and up to 360,000 tonnes of salt are produced annually (2004).

There are known phosphorite ore deposits near Mstsislaw, and in Labkovičy (Krychaw Raion) in eastern Belarus (Mahilyow Voblasts). They contain over 400 million tonnes of phosphorites (prognosed reserves: C1 and C2 categories). Two lesser deposits are known in Brest voblast with prognosed reserves of 95 million tonnes. None of the deposits are used.

Fossil fuels
Due to the Belarus' high level of marshiness, it is very rich in peat. 9,191 peat deposits are known, totalling 5.7 billion tonnes of overall reserves. Before land improvement projects began in 20th century, peat covered 14% of Belarus. Although the country has no deposits of high-ranked coal, the amount of lower-ranked lignite is estimated at 553 million tonnes. Its average heat content is 25.2 MJ/kg. The amount of oil shale in southern Belarus is estimated at 8.8 billion tonnes with 3.6 billion in the Lyuban and Turaŭ deposits alone. Oil shale lies at a depth of 66–600 m and deeper. The layer thickness of oil shale deposits is usually 0.1–3.7 m, and the average heat content is 6.7 MJ/kg. Belarusian oil shale was formed in Late Devonian and Early Carboniferous periods.

The southeastern part of Belarus has many small oil fields. The first oil deposit was discovered near Rechytsa in 1964. Belarus extracts about 1.8 million tonnes of oil per year, which provides 17–18% of country's needs (2004). Oil is usually found in the Late Devonian sediments and is frequently connected with salt layers, but two deposits are situated among the Late Proterozoic sediments.

Metals
Belarus has two big iron deposits – Akolaŭskaje (Okolovskoye; in Stowbtsy Raion), with 175 million tonnes of ore, and Navasiolkaŭskaje (Novosyolkovskoye; in Karelichy District), but neither is used. The Akolaŭskaje deposit lies 235–338 m under the surface with 24.5% of iron (Fe2+, Fe3+) in ore. The share of iron in ores from Navasiolkaŭskaje deposit varies from 16–52%. Ores from the latter deposit have significant amounts of titanium (up to 7% of TiO2) and vanadium (up to 0.16% of V2O5). Several small deposits (ore occurrences) of copper (chalcopyrite, other copper-containing minerals and native copper) and aluminium (boxite-dawsonite) are known. Small deposits of rare earth elements are known in central and southern parts of the country, the biggest being Dyjabazavaye (Diabazovoye; in Zhytkavichy Raion), containing beryllium and rare earth elements.

Other minerals

Many marl and chalk deposits are mined, with large amounts being used to produce cement in Krychaw, Kastsyukovichy and Vawkavysk. Two large deposits of freestone are mined – in Mikashevichy (Luninets District) and in Hluškavičy (Lyelchytsy District). All Belarusian glassworks and brickworks use local sand and clay respectively. The biggest dolomite deposit is located near Vitebsk.

Land use
 Land use
 Arable land: 27.21%
 Permanent crops: 0.59%
 Other: 72.19% (2012)
 Irrigated land
 1,150 km² (2003)
 Total renewable water resources
 58 km3 (2011)
 Freshwater withdrawal (domestic/industrial/agricultural)
 Total: 4.34 km3/yr (32%/65%/3%)
 Per capita: 435.4 m3/yr (200p)
 Water resources
 About 10,800 rivers and streams, with the total length of 91,000 km, and about 11,000 lakes, including 470 lakes with an area exceeding 0.5 km² each. Lake Narach is the largest lake (79.2 km², the deepest point about 25 m). Significant amounts of swampy area, notably in the Polesie region.

Notes

References
This article contains material from the CIA World Factbook (2000, 2003, 2009) which, as a U.S. government publication, is in the public domain.

External links 

Current Status of United Nations Romanization Systems for Geographical Names of Belarus
Chernobyl data for Belarus 
Utility for transliteration of Belarusian geographical names with letters of Latin script

 

bn:বেলারুশ#ভূগোল